St. Lucy's Church is a historic church at 19-27 Ruggiero Plaza at the intersection of Seventh Ave.in Newark, Essex County, New Jersey, United States. It is home to the American National Shrine Of Saint Gerard Majella.

It was built in 1925 and added to the National Register of Historic Places in 1998.

The church is in the Old First Ward near Branch Brook Park, a historically Italian parish in what was Newark's Little Italy, features an annual October procession and festival for St. Gerard Majella, the patron saint of childbearing, that is heavily attended by the New Jersey Italian diaspora. The October Feast  of St. Gerard "became so popular and so widely-known for producing miracle babies for hitherto childless women that in 1977 the National Conference of U.S. Bishops made St. Lucy's the National Shrine of St. Gerard."

The church holds a monthly mass in honor of St. Gerard at which expectant parents and others hoping to become expectant venerate the saint.

See also 
 National Register of Historic Places listings in Essex County, New Jersey

References

External links
 https://www.nytimes.com/1999/10/10/nyregion/city-life-how-a-church-brings-life-to-newark-s-little-italy.html?pagewanted=all&src=pm

Roman Catholic churches completed in 1925
20th-century Roman Catholic church buildings in the United States
Roman Catholic churches in Newark, New Jersey
Churches on the National Register of Historic Places in New Jersey
National Register of Historic Places in Newark, New Jersey
New Jersey Register of Historic Places